Family and Friends is a short-lived Australian television soap opera which debuted on 7 February 1990.

The series was intended to be the Nine Network's response to the already successful soaps on the rival channels - Neighbours and E Street on the Network Ten and Home and Away on the Seven Network.

Synopsis 
Set in a suburban community the series focused on two families - the Chandler and the Italian-Australian Rossi families - who were linked by a long-standing vendetta stemming from an accidental death in the 1950s. Old enmities were renewed by the Romeo-and-Juliet style romance between Jennifer Chandler (Roxane Wilson) and Robert Rossi (Renato Bartolomei).

Despite a strong cast which included actors known for previous soap roles: Abigail (Sons and Daughters), Diane Craig (Prisoner), Anne Phelan (Prisoner), Justine Clarke (Home and Away), and Alyce Platt (Sons and Daughters), the series failed to catch on with the viewers. Episodes were initially broadcast in one-hour installments up against Ten's E Street on Wednesdays and Thursdays at 19:30–20:30, but ratings were disastrous. The show was promptly reformatted as half-hour episodes stripped at 17:30 weeknights, but ratings remained very low. And now that it was lead-in to National Nine News's 6pm bulletin its low ratings meant it remained in a precarious position.

The series then underwent a major revamp which included the loss of six cast members and addition of new cast members including Rebecca Rigg. A week's worth of episodes were produced in the new format, when the series was abruptly canceled on 26 April 1990. The final episodes went to air in a late-night timeslot during the 1990-1991 summer non-ratings period. In total 96 episodes had been produced.

Cast

 Abigail - Doreen Stubbs
 Renato Bartolomei - Robert Rossi
 Rachael Beck - Claudia Rossi
 Justine Clarke - Cheryl Brooks
 Diane Craig - Pamela Chandler
 Robert Forza - Joe Rossi
 Jonathan Hardy - Brother Ignatius
 Gavin Harrison - Renato
 Maxine Klibingaitis - Gloria Stubbs
 Adrian Lee - Marco Rossi
 Dominic McDonald - Greg Chandler
 Anna-Maria Monticelli - Luciana Rossi

 Sean Myers - Greg Chandler
 Ross Newton - Bartholomew Purvis (Thommo) 
 Anne Phelan - Dawn Rossi
 Alyce Platt - Stephanie Collins
 Rebecca Rigg - Pasquelina
 Mario Rossello - Mikey Rossi
 Dinah Shearing - Antoinetta Rossi
 Wendy Strehlow - Janet Simmonds
 Simon Westaway - Damien Chandler
 Kym Wilson - Blondie
 Roxane Wilson - Jennifer Chandler

Notes

External links 
 

Australian television soap operas
Nine Network original programming
1990 Australian television series debuts
1990 Australian television series endings
English-language television shows